ALV Talent Circuit is a talent management company in the Philippines under the leadership of Arnold L. Vegafria.

Artists

Male Talents
Billy Crawford (formerly; moved to Viva Artists Agency)
Gary Estrada
Monsour del Rosario
John Prats (formerly; moved to Cornerstone Entertainment)
Victor Basa
Kris Lawrence
Baron Geisler
Rj Ledesma
David Licauco (co-managed with GMA Artist Center)
Anthony and David Semerad
Kiko Estrada (co-managed with Star Magic)
Martin del Rosario (co-managed with GMA Artist Center)
Enzo Pineda (formerly; moved to Star Magic)
Teejay Marquez
Luis Hontiveros (co-managed with GMA Artist Center)
Vin Abrenica

Female Talents
Kuh Ledesma - singer, actress
Pinky Amador - actress
Geneva Cruz - singer, actress
Winwyn Marquez - actress/dancer
Camille Prats - actress
Iya Villania - dancer/actress (formerly; moved to Asian Artist Agency)
Nikki Gil - singer/actress/TV host
Carla Abellana - actress
Valerie Concepcion - actress
Krista Ranillo 
Samantha Lopez 
Cesca Litton - TV personality
Isabella de Leon 
Isabella L. Gonzalez - singer/songwriter/painter
Divine Lee
Allison Harvard -model
Bianca King - actress TV/Film, TV host
Megan Young – model, actress, Miss World 2013
Shaira Diaz
Beauty Gonzalez (co-managed with GMA Artist Center)
Aiko Melendez
Michelle Dee
Bernadette Allyson
Chanel Morales (co-managed with GMA Artist Center)
Devon Seron
Kris Bernal

Entertainment companies of the Philippines
Mass media in Metro Manila
Television in Metro Manila
Companies based in Pasig
Talent agencies of the Philippines